QVE may refer to:

Quantificational variability effect — a linguistic observation about a feature of natural language semantics
Quintessential Vocal Ensemble — an amateur choral group from Canada
Quantum Vlasov equation — in physics